Seas or SEAS may refer to:

The plural of "sea"
 Seas, a type of wind wave that develops over time
 SEAS, the ticker symbol for SeaWorld Entertainment at the New York Stock Exchange



Used as an abbreviation

Schools
 School of Engineering and Applied Science (disambiguation), the name of several engineering schools at universities in the United States
School of English and American Studies, an institute at the Eötvös Loránd University

Science and technology
Shipboard Environmental (data) Acquisition System, a program developed by National Oceanic and Atmospheric Administration (NOAA) to provide accurate meteorological and oceanographic data in real time from ships at sea through the use of satellite data transmission techniques
Synthetic Environment for Analysis and Simulations

Other
Special Envoy for Monitoring and Combating anti-Semitism